James Vincent Michael O'Brien (born February 18, 1989), better known by his nickname Jomboy, is an American baseball fan who creates social media videos covering sports stories. Jomboy rose to prominence on the internet in 2019 when he created a viral video showing with subtitles what New York Yankees manager Aaron Boone appeared to be saying during an argument with a baseball umpire. O'Brien, his YouTube channel, and his eponymous company Jomboy Media, gained further prominence when he published a series of videos appearing to demonstrate how the Houston Astros were stealing signs in 2017. O'Brien is known for his ability to read lips and use videos to explore sports topics in a light-hearted and goofy style.

Early life and career
O'Brien was born in Teaneck, New Jersey, and lived in Hazlet, New Jersey, until he was eight years old. He later lived in Lindfield, New South Wales; Lake Zurich, Illinois; Southbury, Connecticut; Livermore, California; Newtown, Connecticut; back to the San Francisco Bay Area; and then Lavallette, New Jersey, before moving to New York City. O'Brien attended Central Connecticut State University and graduated near the middle of his class with a degree in history.

After graduating from college, he worked as a videographer. In 2015, he created a viral video called "Scaring My Mom With a Fake Dog," showing a repeated prank on his mother, and sold the rights to the video for $4,000.

Jomboy Media
In 2017, O'Brien created a podcast called "Talkin' Yanks," with his friend Jake Storiale and produced by David Mendelsohn, which built a following and led O'Brien to raise money and turn Jomboy Media into a full-time job by the end of 2018. While watching a July 2019 Yankees game, O'Brien discovered Aaron Boone's argument when umpire Brennan Miller had been picked up by microphones on an MLB.TV feed, and he published the video of the argument with subtitles showing what was being said. The video went viral and Boone's use of the phrase "savages in the box" became a motto for the Yankees. O'Brien published more "breakdowns" of incidents in MLB and other sports with occasionally profane commentary and gained 300,000 YouTube subscribers after the Boone video. Yankees and MLB officials expressed mixed reactions to the viral video, with some questioning whether fans should be able to hear conversations on the field and in the dugout and others appreciating O'Brien for making creative content that could market baseball to younger fans. He also started Talkin' Baseball, a baseball podcast in July 2019 with Storiale. The podcast is produced by Mendelsohn and was joined in 2020 by former Major League Baseball player Trevor Plouffe.

O'Brien gained more fame in November 2019 when he published a two-minute video appearing to demonstrate how the Astros were stealing signs in the 2017 season as a part of the Houston Astros sign stealing scandal, within hours of the release of an article in The Athletic which detailed the allegations for the first time. In the video, O'Brien showed the scheme playing out in real time in a game against the Chicago White Sox. Whenever catcher Kevan Smith called for pitcher Danny Farquhar to throw a changeup, the sound of someone banging on a trash can in the Astros' dugout was clearly audible. The White Sox were forced to change their signs as a result. O'Brien argued that this sequence proved there was no way the Astros could have gotten the signs without the help of technology. O'Brien published more videos in subsequent days, which garnered millions of views on YouTube, Twitter and other platforms.

In March 2022, Jomboy Media signed a partnership with Yankee-broadcaster YES Network. That year, the company consisted of 64 employees.

In an interview with The New York Times, O'Brien described Jomboy Media's banter as "fun, not funny," and stated that, "the easiest way to get laughs sometimes is to knock other people down or go negative. That isn’t really our vibe." This "goofier, more inviting approach" was contrasted to the edginess of fellow sports entertainment company Barstool Sports.

Awards and nominations

References

External links

1989 births
Living people
American YouTubers
Central Connecticut State University alumni
People from Hazlet, New Jersey
Sports YouTubers